The 2022 Mallorca Championships was a men's tennis tournament to be played on outdoor grass courts. It was the second edition of the Mallorca Championships, and part of the ATP Tour 250 series of the 2022 ATP Tour. It was held at the Santa Ponsa Tennis Academy in Santa Ponsa, Spain, from 20 June until 26 June 2022.

Champions

Singles 

  Stefanos Tsitsipas def.  Roberto Bautista Agut, 6–4, 3–6, 7–6(7–2)

Doubles 

  Rafael Matos /  David Vega Hernández def.  Ariel Behar /  Gonzalo Escobar, 7–6(7–5), 6–7(6–8), [10–1]

Singles main draw entrants

Seeds

1 Rankings are as of 13 June 2022.

Other entrants
The following players received wildcards into the main draw:
  Feliciano López
  Jaume Munar
  Stefanos Tsitsipas

The following player received entry using a special exempt into the main draw:
  Nick Kyrgios

The following players received entry from the qualifying draw:
  Antoine Bellier
  Taro Daniel
  Alejandro Tabilo
  Jordan Thompson

Withdrawals
  Lloyd Harris → replaced by  Emil Ruusuvuori
  Hubert Hurkacz → replaced by  Dušan Lajović
  John Isner → replaced by  Mackenzie McDonald
  Oscar Otte → replaced by  Federico Delbonis

Doubles main draw entrants

Seeds

1 Rankings are as of 13 June 2022.

Other entrants
The following pairs received wildcards into the doubles main draw:
  Alexander Erler /  Lucas Miedler
  Petros Tsitsipas /  Stefanos Tsitsipas

Withdrawals
Before the tournament
  Sander Gillé /  Joran Vliegen → replaced by  Aslan Karatsev /  Joran Vliegen
  Marcel Granollers /  Horacio Zeballos → replaced by  Sebastián Báez /  João Sousa
  Pierre-Hugues Herbert /  Albano Olivetti → replaced by  Fabrice Martin /  Hugo Nys

References

External links
 Official website

Mallorca Championships
Mallorca Championships
Mallorca Championships
Mallorca Championships